Al-Taka Sports Club also known as Al-Taka Kassala is a Sudanese football club based in Kassala. It was founded in 1970. They play in the second division in Sudanese football, Sudan Premier League. Their home stadium is Stade Al-Taka Kassala. They were in the top division in 2005 but they were relegated at the end of the season.

External links

Football clubs in Sudan
Association football clubs established in 1970